Canvas is a Belgian television channel of the Flemish public broadcasting organisation Vlaamse Radio- en Televisieomroeporganisatie (VRT). Specialising in both original and adaptations from western Europe and North America, the channel offers: in-depth news and current affairs, non-mainstream entertainment, documentaries, arthouse films, other cultural programming, and most recently additional children's programming.

The channel, launched in December 1997, is part of VRT's second network (VRT 2), which also carries occasional sports programming under the Sporza branding. The current network director of VRT 2 is Bart De Poot. Until 2012, Canvas timeshared with the children's channel Ketnet between 7am and 8pm; Ketnet has thus moved to its own channel and Canvas became a standalone channel.

Prior to the launch of OP12, Canvas broadcast from 8pm until around midnight to 1am each evening. Since October 27, 2018, Ketnet Junior airs on Canvas every afternoon between 2 and 7 pm (Sunday until 6 pm), along with morning broadcasts on Ketnet.

Programming

Belgian

Het Journaal

International

1992
Afterlife
Agatha Christie's Poirot
The Americans
Bancroft
Below the Surface
The Black Donnellys
Blue Murder
Borgen
Bron/Broen
Carnivàle
Carrie and Barry
Chef!
Dark Heart
DCI Banks
Desperate Housewives
Dynasties
Earthflight
Endeavour
Episodes
Extras
Forbrydelsen
The Handmaid's Tale
Hidden
Hotel Babylon
Informer
Inspector George Gently
Inspector Morse
The IT Crowd
Jack Taylor
Lewis
Live from Abbey Road
Luther
Midnattssol
Murder in Mind
My Brilliant Friend
Nature's Microworlds
The Newsroom
The Office
Okkupert
Psi Factor
Pushing Daisies
Sherlock
Silent Witness
Taggart
Top Gear
A Touch of Frost
True Blood
Wallander
Whitechapel

Logos and identities

See also
 Eén
 BRTN TV2
 Ketnet
 List of television channels in Belgium
 Sporza
 Terzake

External links
  

1997 establishments in Belgium
Television channels in Belgium
Television channels in Flanders
Television channels and stations established in 1997